The Latin Grammy Award for Best Pop Vocal Album was an honor presented at the 1st Latin Grammy Awards, a ceremony that recognizes excellence and creates a wider awareness of cultural diversity and contributions of Latin recording artists in the United States and internationally. The award was given to performers for albums containing at least 51% of new recordings of the pop genre. The award category was given only the first year that the Latin Grammy Awards were presented, along with two more discontinued categories, Female Pop Vocal Performance and Male Pop Vocal Performance, which were created to recognize excellence for singles or album tracks. Starting from the 2nd Latin Grammy Awards those categories were merged, creating Best Female Pop Vocal Album and Best Male Pop Vocal Album.

The nominees for the category, in the inaugural year, included Toma Ketama! by Spanish band Ketama, Amarte Es Un Placer by Mexican singer Luis Miguel, MTV Unplugged by Mexican band Maná, Vengo Naciendo by Cuban performer Pablo Milanés, and MTV Unplugged by Colombian singer-songwriter Shakira. Regarding their nomination, Ketama's Antonio Carmona declared that he was surprised: "I think it's the first time a flamenco group gets nominated for something like this... so this is a huge opportunity to be seen by the Latin world." The award was given to Miguel, who also earned the Latin Grammy Awards for Album of the Year and Male Pop Vocal Performance for "Tu Mirada".  About the award outcome, Leila Cobo of Billboard magazine, named Amarte Es Un Placer by Miguel "unremarkable", also mentioning that it was a surprise that the singer won three trophies that night, despite his refusal to attend the show and perform. As for the rest of the nominees, Shakira was awarded two Latin Grammys at the ceremony and eventually earned the Grammy Award for Best Latin Pop Album for her MTV Unplugged. Mexican band Maná received three awards that same year; Record of the Year and Best Rock Performance by a Duo or Group with Vocal for "Corazón Espinado" (a duet with Santana) and Best Pop Performance by a Duo or Group with Vocal for "Se Me Olvidó Otra Vez". Milanés did not receive any awards that night. However, in 2006 he won in two categories, Best Singer-Songwriter Album and Best Traditional Tropical Album.

In 2020, the award for Best Contemporary Pop Vocal Album was discontinued and the award for Best Pop Vocal Album was reinstated.

Winners and nominees

2000s

2020s

See also
 Grammy Award for Best Latin Pop Album
 Latin Grammy Award for Best Female Pop Vocal Album 
 Latin Grammy Award for Best Male Pop Vocal Album

References

Vocal Album
Latin pop albums
Pop Vocal Album
Awards established in 2000